This is a list of members of the Australian Senate from 1 July 1950 to 28 April 1951. The Senate was expanded from 36 to 60 seats as a result of legislation passed in 1948, which came into effect on 22 February 1950. The membership of the newly expanded Senate broke down as follows:
18 of its members (3 for each state) were elected at the 28 September 1946 election, the last election under the plurality-at-large voting system where the Australian Labor Party had won 15 of the 18 seats. These senators had terms starting on 1 July 1947 and due to finish on 30 June 1953.
42 of its members (7 for each state) were elected at the 10 December 1949 election, which was the first election conducted with a single transferable vote under a proportional voting system. The senators were divided into two classes:
30 of its members (5 for each state) had terms starting on 1 July 1950 and due to finish on 30 June 1956. The 18 senators elected in the 21 August 1943 election served until their terms ended on 30 June 1950.
12 of its members (2 for each state) had terms starting on 22 February 1950 (the day the term of the House of Representatives began) and due to finish on 30 June 1953.

Labor retained a Senate majority at the election. The Senate was dissolved for the 1951 election, which was a double dissolution. Labor has not held a Senate majority since.

Notes

References

Members of Australian parliaments by term
20th-century Australian politicians
Australian Senate lists